Thomas Dallas Shreiner (1941 – December 27, 2015) was an American football player and coach. He served as the head football coach at Delaware Valley College from 1973 to 1975, compiling a record of 6–17–1. Shreiner played college football at Gettysburg College in Gettysburg, Pennsylvania.

References

1941 births
2015 deaths
Atlantic Coast Football League players
Delaware Valley Aggies football coaches
Gettysburg Bullets football players
High school football coaches in Pennsylvania
Lehigh Mountain Hawks football coaches
Players of American football from Pennsylvania
Sportspeople from Lancaster, Pennsylvania